The 1982 U/Tex Wranglers season was the eight and final season of the franchise in the Philippine Basketball Association (PBA).

Transactions

Summary
The Wranglers had Julius Wayne, a seventh round draft pick by the Portland Trail Blazers in the 1981 NBA draft, as their import for the Reinforced Filipino Conference.  U/Tex finish the elimination phase with an 8-10 won-loss card. The Wranglers scored an upset 2-0 sweep off Gilbey's Gin in the best-of-three quarterfinals. They lost to top-seeded San Miguel Beermen in four games in the best-of-five semifinal series. Wayne return to play four more games in the Second Conference Asian Invitationals where U/Tex failed to score a single victory.
 
Coach Glenn McDonald opted for Leroy Jackson, who led the Wranglers to the finals last season, and Ira Terrell, a former Tefilin import, as their two reinforcements in the Open Conference. After 11 games in the elimination phase, Terrell was replaced by Leo Cunningham, who played only two games before another U/Tex returnee Francois Wise came in to replaced Cunningham and teamed up with Jackson for the rest of the conference. U/Tex were tied with three other teams going into the last scheduled quarterfinal matches. The Wranglers lost to San Miguel, 112-118 on November 23, in what turn out to be their final game. The Walter Euyang ballclub would disband its franchise the following season.

Won-loss records vs Opponents

Roster

Trades

Additions

References

U-Tex
U-Tex Wranglers seasons